Robert W. Lenski (June 11, 1926 – June 19, 2002) was an American screenwriter.

Lenski was born on a farm in Michigan. He attended at University of Michigan, where he earned his degree. 

Lenski began his career in 1972, as writing an episode for the police procedural television series Longstreet. Later in his career, he wrote for other television programs, as his credits includes, The Streets of San Francisco, Mannix, Planet of the Apes, Cannon, The Dain Curse, Barnaby Jones, The F.B.I., The New Perry Mason and Kojak. Lenski also wrote for television films, as his credits includes, After the Promise, Decoration Day, Saint Maybe, Breathing Lessons and What the Deaf Man Heard.

Lenski was nominated for three Primetime Emmy Awards from 1978 to 1994. His last screenwriting credit was from the television film A Death in the Family.

Lenski died in June 2002 of cancer at his home in Los Angeles, California, at the age of 76.

References

External links 

1926 births
2002 deaths
People from Michigan
Screenwriters from Michigan
American screenwriters
American television writers
American male television writers
20th-century American writers
University of Michigan alumni